Q-School 2016 – Event 1 was the first of two qualifying tournaments for the 2016/17 snooker season. It took place from 11 to 16 May 2016 at Meadowside Centre in Burton-upon-Trent, England.

The four qualifying spots were won by Fang Xiongman, Christopher Keogan, Cao Yupeng and Chen Zhe who beat Daniel Womersley, Marc Davis, Joe Roberts and David Lilley respectively in the finals of their draw.

Format
The tournament consisted of players being randomly assigned to four sections. Each section plays in the knockout system with the winner of each section earning a two-year tour card to play on the main tour for the 2016/17 snooker season and 2017/18 snooker season. All matches will be the best-of-7.

Players in the tournament consist of former professionals trying to regain their tour cards and amateurs attempting to join the main tour for the first time. Former professionals in the tournament include former world number 10 Tony Drago as well as Cao Yupeng, Alex Davies, Alexander Ursenbacher, John Astley, Joel Walker, Gerard Greene, Steven Hallworth, Andy Hicks, Jamie O'Neill, Lucky Vatnani, Alex Borg, Barry Pinches, Adam Duffy, Peter Lines, Chen Zhe, Jordan Brown, Lyu Haotian and 2016 Ladies World Champion Reanne Evans who was attempting to regain a place on the main tour for the first time since 2011. Several continental and national amateur also competed such as 2016 Under-18 European Snooker Champion: Tyler Rees, 2013 United States Champion: Corey Deuel, 2013 German Champion: Lukas Kleckers, 2014 Welsh Champion: Jamie Clarke, 2015 Austrian Champion: Andreas Ploner. Former English Champions Ben Harrison and Michael Rhodes plus 2016 champion Jamie Bodle and 2015 Ladies World Champion Ng On Yee who along with Reanne Evans and Heather Clare were the only female competitors in the tournament.

Main draw

Round 1

Best of 7 frames

Section 1

Section 2

Section 3

Section 4

Century Breaks

 142, 103, 102  Fang Xiongman
 136, 130  Lyu Haotian
 135, 106  Michael Collumb
 130  Alex Borg
 125  Alex Davies
 123  Steven Hallworth
 115  Ian Preece
 113  Thomas Barton
 108  Zack Richardson
 106  Barry Pinches
 106  John Astley
 106  Cao Yupeng
 100  Zak Surety

References

Snooker competitions in England
Q School (snooker)
2016 in snooker
2016 in English sport
Sport in Burton upon Trent
May 2016 sports events in the United Kingdom